Kalilan (also Romanized as Kalīlān) is a village in Meymand Rural District, in the Central District of Shahr-e Babak County, Kerman Province, Iran. At the 2006 census, its population was 27, in 4 families.

References 

Populated places in Shahr-e Babak County